Jarno Lion (born 13 February 2001) is a Belgian professional footballer who plays as a midfielder for Eerste Divisie club Helmond Sport, on loan from Mechelen.

Career

Mechelen
Lion played youth football for Wolvertem SC, Mechelen and Club Brugge, before returning to Mechelen in 2018. In January 2020, he joined the first team on their winter training camp to Spain.

Loan to Helmond Sport
On 4 August 2021, Lion signed his first professional contract with Mechelen and was sent on loan to Dutch Eerste Divisie club Helmond Sport as part of the two clubs' partnership, alongside Jules Houttequiet and Ilias Breugelmans. He made his professional debut on 6 August 2021, the opening day of the 2021–22 Eerste Divisie season, where he was a starter at midfielder and played the entire match, which ended in a 2–0 loss against FC Den Bosch at De Vliert. On 15 April 2022, he headed in his first goal off a corner-kick from Arno Van Keilegom in a 5–3 league defeat to Roda JC Kerkrade. As a starting defensive midfielder through the 2021–22 season, Lion was lauded for his performances as the "vacuum cleaner" of Helmond Sport.

On 15 June 2022, Lion's loan to Helmond Sport was extended for a second season. He was increasingly benched for newcomers Elmo Lieftink and Michael Chacón during the 2022–23 season, as the club had seen an influx of players under new head coach Sven Swinnen and his replacement, interim coach Tim Bakens.

Style of play
Lion is a defensive midfielder, valued for his ability to win the ball and recycle possession quickly. He is also a refined passer of the ball with a good technique. He has compared his style of play to compatriot Axel Witsel.

Career statistics

References

External links

2001 births
Living people
People from Asse
Belgian footballers
Belgian expatriate footballers
Association football midfielders
K.V. Mechelen players
Club Brugge KV players
Helmond Sport players
Eerste Divisie players
Expatriate footballers in the Netherlands
Belgian expatriate sportspeople in the Netherlands
Footballers from Flemish Brabant